Brevity is concision or brevitas, the quality of being brief or concise. 

It may also refer to:
 Brevity (comic strip), a comic strip created by Guy Endore-Kaiser and Rodd Perry
 brevity code, a vocal word replacement system
 Operation Brevity, a World War II battle